Route 15 is a state highway in New Jersey, spanning Morris and Sussex counties, which travels for  from U.S. Route 46 (East McFarland Street) in Dover to an intersection with U.S. Route 206 in Frankford Township. It becomes a divided highway in Wharton Borough until becoming a freeway bypass near Sparta. Route 15 was originally Route 6A from 1927 until 1953, when a renumbering occurred and the route was given its current number. Since the finishing of the Sparta Bypass, the New Jersey Department of Transportation (NJDOT) and North Jersey Transportation Planning Authority have considered more bypasses and alignment changes for Route 15.

Route description

Route 15 currently exists in two disconnected segments. The southern segment begins in downtown Dover at an intersection with U.S. Route 46 (US 46). It follows Bergen Street south a short distance to Clinton Street, then turns west along Clinton Street through downtown Dover. This segment, which is signed in downtown Dover, was disconnected from the rest of the route when a new intersection between US 46 and Route 15 was constructed just northwest of downtown Dover. Route 15 formerly passed under US 46 along the Dover and Rockaway River Railroad at the location of this new intersection. The southern segment ends at a dead end just southeast of the new intersection, with the northern segment of Route 15 starting again at US 46 almost directly above the rail line.

From the new intersection with US 46, Route 15 continues north, exiting Dover and entering Rockaway Township. The road remains two lanes past the turn for the Rockaway Townsquare shopping mall. For a very short distance Route 15 becomes a freeway as it crosses the Interstate 80 (I-80) interchange. A mile north, the road becomes a four lane divided highway with exits for a few businesses and Picatinny Arsenal. At that point, Route 15 leaves Rockaway Township and enters Jefferson Township. In Jefferson Township, the northbound and southbound lanes become about a quarter mile apart as it climbs up a steep mountain. The northbound lanes are nearly a freeway with limited access to businesses on the southbound lanes. The northbound lanes have a speed limit of 50 mph as well. These two lanes were built in the late 1960s.

Slightly farther north, Route 15 becomes a freeway and the northbound and southbound lanes come closer together. At this point, the original two-lane Route 15 breaks off into Route 181, heading through Jefferson Township and into downtown Sparta. Several miles north, the freeway leaves Morris County in Jefferson Township and enters Sussex County and Sparta Township, bypassing downtown Sparta. After bypassing downtown Sparta, Route 181 ends and merges onto Route 15. The freeway then ends and Route 15 becomes a two-lane road before crossing a New York, Susquehanna and Western Railway branch line. After Route 15 leaves Sparta and enters Lafayette Township, it merges with Route 94.  Routes 15 and 94 run as a concurrency until Route 94 turns off to the southeast while Route 15 heads northwest. It continues into Frankford Township and comes to an end at U.S. Route 206 and County Route 565.

History

Route 15 follows the course of an old Lenape trail running from what is now Ross's Corner to Dover. In 1804, this road was legislated as a part of the Union Turnpike, which ran from Morristown north to Dingman's Ferry in Montague. In 1938, Route 15 was designated as State Highway Route 6A. In the 1953 renumbering, the current designation was assigned. Originally, Route 15 was a two-lane road for its entire length. The road originally went through downtown Sparta and today that road is known as Route 181. In the mid-1960s, plans were made to widen Route 15 to four lanes through Jefferson Township. However, businesses were on both sides of this road, thus making a widening difficult. As a result, the additional two lanes were built behind the businesses on the east side of the road. In 1974, a freeway bypass was built around the Sparta Business district and into Jefferson Township. The freeway began in northern Sparta and extended to Lake Hopatcong. 

In Sparta, New Jersey Department of Transportation commissioner Jack Lettire and state senator Robert Littell announced the completion of a project of restructuring the Route 15-Houses Corner Road intersection, which began ground breaking in 2002 by James E. McGreevey, then-governor of New Jersey. The project was completed in August 2004. The original intersection was a signalized intersection with a blinking light and no left turn-off lanes from Route 15. Because of heavy traffic, turning left onto Houses Corner Road became dangerous for motorists. The intersection now has a full traffic light. The project cost a total of $15.5 million.

Wilson Drive and White Lake Road were also realigned to form one signalized intersection, with completion originally expected in 2008. The intersection was improved, with construction finishing on June 1, 2009, after eight months of work starting in October 2008. The project cost the state $2.3 million (2009 USD) to fund for construction by the North Jersey Transportation Planning Authority. Studies are being made to improve the Route 15 corridor from I-80 to U.S. Route 206.  Concepts include widening, the addition of climbing lanes, and a potential bypass of Lafayette.

The project to construct a new intersection at US 46 in Dover began in 2008; the project also entailed the replacement of bridges on US 46 over the Morristown and Erie Railway (now Dover and Rockaway River Railroad) and Rockaway River. A temporary intersection was completed in January 2010 utilizing a former US 46 westbound–Route 15 northbound ramp. The permanent intersection was completed in August 2011.

There is an ongoing local grassroots movement to honor the late U.S. President Ronald Reagan by renaming Route 15 after him.  Most recently on February 2, 2012, a bill was introduced in the New Jersey General Assembly by Assemblymen Michael Patrick Carroll, Gary R. Chiusano, Jay Webber and Assemblywoman Alison Littell McHose to designate Route 15 as the "Ronald Reagan Memorial Highway".

Major intersections

See also

References

External links

NYCRoads.com NJ 15 Freeway
New Jersey Roads: Route 15

015
Limited-access roads in New Jersey
Transportation in Morris County, New Jersey
Transportation in Sussex County, New Jersey